Lise Vaugeois is a Canadian politician, who was elected to the Legislative Assembly of Ontario in the 2022 provincial election. She represents the district of Thunder Bay—Superior North as a member of the Ontario New Democratic Party.

Previously Vaugeois was a professor at the Lakehead University. She moved to Thunder Bay to play in the Thunder Bay Symphony Orchestra.

Electoral record

References 

Living people
21st-century Canadian politicians
21st-century Canadian women politicians
Ontario New Democratic Party MPPs
Women MPPs in Ontario
Politicians from Thunder Bay
Franco-Ontarian people
Academic staff of Lakehead University
Musicians from Thunder Bay
Year of birth missing (living people)
Canadian LGBT people in provincial and territorial legislatures
21st-century Canadian LGBT people